Joseph Richard Grah (born March 23, 1971) is an American musician, singer, songwriter and record producer based in Los Angeles who has fronted multiple bands, most notably the Dallas-based alternative rock group Jibe.

Early life
Grah lived in Philadelphia until age eight when his family's home was lost to a fire, from which he barely escaped. His family moved often, living at various times in New Jersey, California, Arkansas and Oklahoma. As a child Joe played drums in the school band, and he gravitated to music as a source of constancy amidst his itinerant adolescence. His family settled in Tulsa, Oklahoma in the mid-1980s where Joe started his first punk band, Crimes Against Humanity, at age 15. He went on to drum for other local punk bands such as Morbid Truth, and Carnage, the latter of which opened a string of shows with Pantera. On December 6, 1991, at age 20, Joe attended a concert by the Red Hot Chili Peppers, Smashing Pumpkins and Pearl Jam in Kansas City, Kansas. Eddie Vedder’s performance that night inspired Joe to be a singer and front his own band.

Music career

Jibe (1993–2004)

By 1993 Joe was living in Dallas, Texas and working at Guitar Center where he made connections with other local musicians and formed the band Jibe in early 1994. The group recorded a live album later that year, and soon became well-known for their frequent and intense live performances. Over the course of the next nine years, Jibe would issue three studio albums, and play over 2,500 concerts across the United States, sharing the stage with many of the top rock bands of the day. Jibe’s third album, Uprising was particularly successful, spawning the hit single, "Yesterday’s Gone" and sweeping the Dallas music awards in 2003, earning titles for song of the year, alternative album of the year, producer of the year, and male vocalist of the year. The Dallas Cowboys also chose "Yesterday’s Gone" as the theme song for their 2003 season.  Jibe was on the verge of making it big when the band suddenly announced their breakup in the summer of 2004.

Loser (2004–2006)

Following the breakup of Jibe in 2004, Joe moved to Los Angeles and formed the band Loser with guitarist John 5. The group were signed to Island Records and their song "Disposable Sunshine" was included on the Fantastic Four soundtrack. They recorded an album entitled Just Like You in 2006, and embarked on a national arena tour with Staind and Theory of a Deadman. Loser broke due to scheduling conflicts with John 5's obligations as touring guitarist in Rob Zombie's band.

South of Earth (2008–2010)
From 2008 to 2010 Grah fronted the band South of Earth which included guitarist Geno Lenardo (Filter), bassist Bill Gower (Boy Hits Car), and drummer Joe Babiak (Kill Hannah). The group recorded several songs during various sessions at Johnny K’s Groovemaster Studios in Chicago, and with producer Johnny Andrews in Atlanta, as well as with Danny Lohner in Los Angeles. Although the band’s album remains unreleased, music videos for several of their songs are available on YouTube.

Other Projects (2011–2015)
In 2011 Grah wrote and recorded the song "New Machine" for the film Best Dramatic Short and he appeared in the movie performing the track during the closing sequence.

In 2011, Italian band Cervello chose the song "The First Time", written by Joe Grah, John 5 & Bob Marlette, to record and release as their major label debut.

In 2012 Joe began recording and self-producing home demos for an electronic rock solo project he called Dead Girls Don't Lie, and released several online singles from 2013 to 2015. He  assembled a live backing band and for the next two years performed locally in Los Angeles, including a show at The Roxy Theater, and a set at the Day of the Dead Festival in 2014.

In 2014 Grah produced the single "Ain't the One" by soul singer Jen Awad.

Grah also fronts the band I Am The Wolf, a project which includes Charles Lee Salvaggio, who was also a member of Loser with Grah.

Jibe Reunites (2015–2018)
In 2015 Jibe returned to play their first concert in eleven years, to much publicity.  In 2017 the group released their highly anticipated fourth studio album Epic Tales of Human Nature. Not only was Grah lead singer and songwriter on the album, he served as producer on the songs "Waiting", "A Shadow in the Garden", and "Sanctuary". In March 2018 the album's second single "Release" broke into the Top 50 on the Mediabase active rock chart. In May 2018 the band hit the road, joining Theory of a Deadman for a gulf coast tour, and also toured the west coast in August. In September, Jibe opened for Slash in Houston, and were invited to tour with Candlebox in the fall of 2018. However Jibe reluctantly dropped out of the tour and again went on hiatus when Grah was seriously injured in a head-on collision while riding his motorcycle in Hollywood on October 8, 2018.

Solo work (2019–Present)
During his months long recovery from the motorcycle accident, Joe began writing and recording new solo songs in his home studio. He self-produced the recordings, working with mixer Evan Rodinache (Flyleaf, Escape the Fate, Powerman 5000) and Grammy Award winning mastering engineer Bill Hare. Instead of releasing the tracks simultaneously as an album, he decided to distribute them individually as singles on a quasi-monthly basis, with accompanying music videos; however the COVID-19 pandemic eventually caused delays of several months between some releases. Grah released the first track "Who Ya Dyin’ For?" on Friday the 13th of September, and the second song "Tidal Wave" arrived at Halloween. The third installment, "2Nite" was released at Thanksgiving, the fourth song "Parts + Pieces" at Christmas/New Years, and the fifth installment "The Great Unknown" was released around Easter 2020. The sixth installment, "Runaway" coincided with Father's Day. The seventh song "In a Place Where Nothing Lives" was released on Halloween 2020. His eighth song "Blue" was released on Christmas 2020. A ninth song "Sweet Decay" arrived on Memorial Day 2021. Grah's tenth single "Down By The Lake" was released on New Year's Day 2022. His eleventh song, "Summer Game," dropped on Labor Day weekend in 2022. Joe dropped his tweleveth song, Chemicals & Doctrines on Halloween weekend 2022.

Discography

External links

References

1971 births
Living people
20th-century American singers
21st-century American singers
Alternative metal musicians
Alternative rock singers
American alternative rock musicians
American hard rock musicians
American male singer-songwriters
American rock songwriters
Musicians from Dallas
20th-century American male singers
21st-century American male singers
Singer-songwriters from Texas